The Rally of Congolese Democrats and Nationalists is a political party in the Democratic Republic of Congo. It is headed by Roger Lumbala.

The party won 4 out of 500 seats in the parliamentary elections.  In the 19 January 2007 Senate elections, the party won out 1 of 108 seats.

References

Political parties in the Democratic Republic of the Congo
Congolese nationalism (Democratic Republic of the Congo)